MacAmp is an early GUI-based MP3 audio player, first released on April 13, 1997, for the Macintosh by Dmitry Boldyrev of Nullsoft (and later Subband).  Its MP3 decoding capability was based on the PlayMedia Systems AMP MPEG-2, Layers 1, 2 and 3 decoder.

By 1999, MacAmp was cited as a "premier MP3 player" and most popular such player for the Macintosh.

In September 1999, a revamped version of MacAmp was released under the name "Macast".

See also 
 Comparison of media players
 Dosamp
 Winamp

References

External links 
 Playmedia Systems, Inc. Owner of AMP trademark
 MacAmp Review The Past Really Is Soon!

Macintosh media players
Computer-related introductions in 1997